Ryley Miller (born September 24, 1992) is a Canadian professional ice hockey defenceman. He currently plays for the Stony Plain Eagles of the Chinook Hockey League. Miller played the 2013-2014 season in the Czech Republic with SK Horácká Slavia Třebíč of the First National Hockey League.

Miller made his Czech Extraliga debut playing with HC Kometa Brno during the 2013–14 Czech Extraliga season. Miller is known for his tough game play style, oftentimes being penalized for his questionable hits, and notably an enforcer on his teams gathering many fighting major penalties throughout the course of a season.

References

External links

1992 births
Living people
Brandon Wheat Kings players
Canadian ice hockey defencemen
HC Kometa Brno players
Spruce Grove Saints players
Wheeling Nailers players
Canadian expatriate ice hockey players in the Czech Republic
People from Spruce Grove
Ice hockey people from Alberta
Canadian expatriate ice hockey players in the United States